Hadley House may refer to:

in the United Kingdom
Hadley House, Hadley Green, near Chipping Barnet

in the United States (by state)
Story-Hadley House, Pine Mountain, Georgia, listed on the NRHP in Harris County, Georgia
Mary Alica Hadley House, Louisville, Kentucky, listed on the NRHP in Jefferson County, Kentucky
Gilbert Hadley Three-Decker, Worcester, Massachusetts, NRHP-listed
Hadley-Ludwick House, Las Cruces, New Mexico, listed on the NRHP in Doña Ana County, New Mexico
Hadley House and Grist Mill, Pittsboro, North Carolina, listed on the NRHP in Chatham County, North Carolina
Gregson-Hadley House, Siler City, North Carolina, listed on the NRHP in Chatham County, North Carolina
Hadley House (Stroud, Oklahoma), listed on the NRHP in Lincoln County, Oklahoma
Walter Hadley House, Stroud, Oklahoma, listed on the NRHP in Lincoln County, Oklahoma
Hadley-Locke House, Corvallis, Oregon, listed on the NRHP in Benton County, Oregon
Brattain–Hadley House, Springfield, Oregon, listed on the NRHP in Lane County, Oregon
Denny P. Hadley House, Brentwood, Tennessee, listed on the NRHP in Williamson County, Tennessee